Klenovnik is the biggest Croatian castle. It is situated in Klenovnik, Varaždin County.

First mentioning of the castle dates back in the 13th century when the Hungarian-Croatian king Béla IV takes it away from Pochun and gives it to then ruler of town Varaždin. In the late 17th century, king Maksimilijan sells this castle for 20 000 forint to noble Croatian families Gašpar I Drašković.

In the 19th century, Count Drašković sold Klenovnik in order to gain money for the restoration of his other family castle, Trakošćan. Klenovnik was bought by then Austrian minister of finance, baron Bruck. His family later sold the castle which, since then, changes its owners regularly. Today, the castle is owned by city of Zagreb and it has become a hospital for patients with tuberculosis. Before its renovation in 1925, Klenovnik supposedly had 90 rooms and over 365 windows. The castle has a huge and beautiful park, stunning wall paintings from the 19th century, three baroque altars, pulpit and a Drašković family vault.

Castles in Croatia